Keizai is the Japanese word for economics. It may refer to:

 Chiba Keizai University
 The Nihon Keizai Shimbun, former name of The Nikkei, the world's largest financial newspaper
 Ryutsu Keizai University, in Ibaraki
 Ryutsu Keizai University FC, a football (soccer) club
 Sangyō Keizai Shimbun, or Sankei Shimbun, a daily newspaper in Japan
 Toyo Keizai, a Japanese book and magazine publisher